Dendrobium platycaulon is a species of orchid native to Borneo and the Philippines.

References

External links
IOSPE orchid photos, Dendrobium platycaulon Rolfe 1892 
Orchids Online
Forest Treasures Plants and Landscapes (Quezon City, Philippines), Dendrobium Platycaulon (endemic/Philippines)

Platycaulon
Orchids of Borneo
Orchids of the Philippines
Plants described in 1892